The Kostomuksha mine is a large iron mine located in north-western Russia in the Republic of Karelia. Kostomuksha represents one of the largest iron ore reserves in Russia and in the world having estimated reserves of 10 billion tonnes of ore grading 45% iron metal.

References 

Iron mines in Russia